Küsəkəran (also, Kyusakeran and Kyusa-Kyaran) is a village and municipality in the Lerik Rayon of Azerbaijan.  It has a population of 715.

References 

Populated places in Lerik District